The Ängelholm UFO memorial is a monument dedicated to an alleged unidentified flying object (UFO) landing in the Kronoskogen forest near the city of Ängelholm in Skåne, Sweden. It consists of a concrete scale model of the UFO and landing traces. The model was built from the measurements of Gösta Carlsson, who claimed to have seen the UFO and interacted with its occupants. The concrete disc was erected in 1972 and has become a tourist destination over the years. It is Swedish National Heritage Board heritage site number RAÄ Strövelstrop 47:1.

History 
The monument memorialises the landing of a UFO, which is said to have taken place on 18 May 1946 in Kronoskogen, a forested area of Ängelholm Municipality. The event was reported by Swedish entrepreneur, Gösta Carlsson, the founder and owner of Cernelle AB. The model was placed in the forest in September 1972, along with plaques describing the event. As mentioned in the plaques, the model was built at a one-eighth scale, based on Carlsson's description and sketches. The concrete paths are recreations of what Carlsson described as impressions left in the ground where the craft landed.

In 1995, Swedish ufologist Clas Svahn wrote a book with Carlsson about the incident, Mötet i gläntan (English: The Meeting in the Clearing). According to Svahn, there was no convincing evidence that the event occurred as described by Carlsson. Svahn has described typical alien abductions as "stories [that] originate in inner experiences rather than in an external, physical reality." Only parts of the monument reference physical artifacts. Carlsson returned to the clearing where he witnessed the craft and its pale occupants. He found and measured gouges on the ground that he believed corresponded to the craft's retractable legs and fin that would become a basis for the monument. Carlsson acknowledges that what gave the event significance to him were fainting spells, recurring nightmares, and an experience that he described as if his skull was an overloaded radio receiver.

The monument is Swedish National Heritage Board heritage site number RAÄ Strövelstrop 47:1. The monument and surrounding clearing now function as a tourist location, within walking distance from the beach only and only a few kilometers from the city of Ängelholm. In 2015, an initiative was put forward to restore the memorial. The cleanup included clearing away encroaching plants and replacing the rotten wood benches. As of 2022, there are guided tours through the area.

Gallery

See also
 Emilcin UFO memorial – A similar monument was erected in Emilcin, Poland where farmer Jan Wolski says he experienced an alien abduction in 1978.
 List of reported UFO sightings – A list of notable UFO sightings, mostly with corresponding Wikipedia articles.
 The Robert Taylor incident is commemorated by the Dechmont UFO Trail in Livingston, Scotland.

References

Further reading
 
 

UFO culture
Buildings and structures in Skåne County
Tourist attractions in Sweden
1972 establishments in Sweden
UFO sightings